"Please Forgive Me" is a song by British singer-songwriter David Gray from his fourth album, White Ladder (1998). The song was originally released on 22 November 1999, then re-issued on 16 October 2000. On its first release in November 1999, it reached  72 on the UK Singles Chart, while the 2000 re-issue peaked at No. 18.

Background
David Gray said in an interview that the inspiration of the song came from "nowhere." Paul Hartnoll of Orbital was commissioned to remix the song. The remix was pressed as 10-inch and 12-inch promos and was featured as the "record of the week" on Pete Tong's Essential Selection, gaining massive airplay in Ibiza.

Track listings
UK CD single (1999)
 "Please Forgive Me" (twelve inch version)
 "Please Forgive Me" (Paul Hartnoll remix)

UK (2000) and Australian CD single
 "Please Forgive Me" (radio edit)
 "Please Forgive Me" (Paul Hartnoll remix)
 "Babylon" (live at the Point, Dublin, 22 December 1999)
 "Please Forgive Me" (enhanced video)

Personnel
Personnel are lifted from the White Ladder album booklet.
 David Gray – writing, vocals, guitar, piano, keyboards, production
 Craig McClune – bass, keyboards, drums, production
 Iestyn Polson – production, programming, engineering

Charts

Certifications

Release history

References

David Gray (musician) songs
1998 songs
1999 singles
East West Records singles
RCA Records singles
Songs written by David Gray (musician)